This is a comprehensive listing of the theatre work of Orson Welles.

1918

1925

1926

1927

1928

1929

1930

1931

1932

1933

1934

1935

1936

1937

1938

1939

1941

1942

1943

1946

1947

1950

1951

1953

1955

1956

1960

Notes

References

Theatre-related lists
20th-century theatre
theatre
Works by Orson Welles